Milan Savić may refer to:

 Milan Savić (footballer, born 1994), Serbian football defender
 Milan Savić (footballer, born 2000), Bosnian football winger
 Milan Savić (author) (1845–1930), Serbian writer and literary critic
 Milan Savić (politician), Serbian politician